Don State Technical University (Donskoi gosudarstvenny tehnicheski universitet) is a university in Rostov-on-Don, Russia.

History 
Don State Technical University was established on May 20, 1930. It was originally named North Caucasus Institute of Agricultural Engineering and had two faculties: (Agricultural engineering and Metalworking). In 1938 the institute was renamed as the Institute of Agricultural Engineering. Until 1992, it was the leading establishment for agricultural machinery design and high-speed turning in the Soviet Union. In 1937, it began its cooperation with Rostselmasch and developed combine harvester Stalinets-1, which was represented at Exposition Internationale des Arts et Techniques dans la Vie Moderne in Paris and won a golden medal. In 1940, there were 21 departments and 14 degree programs. In 1941, the institute as well as Rostselmash were evacuated to Tashkent. Many buildings of the institute were destroyed by German bombs. Teaching began again in August, 1943. In the late 1940s they began redevelopment to combine harvesters for maize and sunflowers based upon Stalinets. In 1960s, new faculties and study programs were established to support the organization of mass production.

Today 

On December 24 1992, the institute changed its status to become a university. The university offers a variety of studies in 16 faculties. Regional branches of the university are located in Volgodonsk, Taganrog, Azov and Yessentuki. As of 2012, the Bologna Process was being implemented.

References 

Educational institutions established in 1930
1930 establishments in Russia
Universities in Rostov-on-Don
Technical universities and colleges in Russia